The Claud Jones-class destroyer escorts were four destroyer escorts built for the United States Navy in the late 1950s. These ships were a diesel-powered version of the earlier  and were designed with the aim of producing a cheaper ship suitable for rapid production in wartime. These ships also had reduced armament and speed compared to their predecessors. They were not seen as effective anti-submarine warfare vessels by the United States Navy and were sold after only 15 years service to the Indonesian Navy.

Description
The class was designed under project SCB 131 as a cost-effective version of an anti-submarine warfare (ASW) ship that could be built quickly in case of rapid mobilization. The Claud Jones class had an aluminum superstructure, a tripod mast forward and a pole mast further back amidships, with two stacks.

Following the guidelines given to them, the designers chose a two-shafted diesel-powered ship to maximize cost effectiveness.

The ships were initially armed with two /50 caliber guns, one located forward with a closed shield and one located aft with an open shield. For ASW, the destroyer escorts were equipped with two forward-firing hedgehog anti-submarine mortars, two fixed  torpedo tubes for Mk 32 torpedoes and one depth charge rack placed over the stern. The fixed torpedo tubes were later removed and replaced with two triple tube mounts. In 1961, Charles Berry and McMorris received a Norwegian-designed Terne III depth charge system deployed via rockets.

The Claud Jones class was initially equipped with variable depth sonar, AN/SPS-10 and AN/SPS-6 search radars and SQS-29/32 hull-mounted sonar. The variable depth sonar was later removed. The vessels had a ship's company of 175 with 15 officers and 160 enlisted personnel. The class was not well-received and the designers were ordered to come back with another design, leading to the successor s.

Indonesian service
The four vessels of the class were transferred to the Indonesian Navy in 1973–1974. In Indonesian service, Samadikun (ex-John R. Perry) and Martadinata (ex-Charles Berry) had one of the 3-inch guns removed and given Soviet twin-mounted  guns and twin-mounted  guns. Monginsidi (ex-Claud Jones) and Ngurah Rai (ex-McMorris) kept their two 3-inch mounts and had twin-mounted 25 mm guns added.

Ships in class

Notes

Citations

References

External links
 Claud Jones-class ocean escorts at Destroyer History Foundation
 List of Claude Jones class Destroyer Escorts

 
 
Indonesian Navy